Mount Logan is an 8,413-foot-elevation (2,564-meter) mountain summit located in Garfield County, Colorado, United States. Interstate 70 traverses the southeast base of the mountain. The mountain and surrounding area is controlled by the Bureau of Land Management. This landform's toponym has appeared in publications since at least 1913, and has been officially adopted by the U.S. Board on Geographic Names.

Climate
According to the Köppen climate classification system, Mount Logan is located in a semi-arid climate zone. Summers are hot and dry, while winters are cold with some snow. Temperatures reach  on 5.3 days,  on 57 days, and remain at or below freezing on 13 days annually.

Geology
Mount Logan is an erosional remnant of the Roan Plateau. The mountain consists of Eocene-age sedimentary rock, primarily sandstone and shale. The mountain is capped by Uinta Formation, and the slopes consist of the Green River Formation. A Holocene-age landslide is conspicuous on the southeast slope. Oil shale was mined on the mountain in the 1920s by the Mount Logan Oil Shale Mining & Refining Company.

Gallery

See also
 
 Roan Cliffs

References

External links
 Weather forecast: Mount Logan
 Mt. Logan (photo): Flickr
 Mt. Logan (historical photo, circa 1920s): Denverlibrary.org

Colorado Plateau
Landforms of Garfield County, Colorado
North American 2000 m summits
Sandstone formations of the United States
Mountains of Colorado